This is a list of the 871 civil parishes in Scotland.

Context 

From 1845 to 1930, parishes formed part of the local government system of Scotland: having parochial boards from 1845 to 1894, and parish councils from 1894 until 1930.

The parishes, which had their origins in the ecclesiastical parishes of the Church of Scotland, often overlapped county boundaries, largely because they reflected earlier territorial divisions.

In the early 1860s, many parishes which were physically detached from their county were re-allocated to the county by which they were surrounded; some border parishes were transferred to neighbouring counties. This affects the indexing of such things as birth, marriage, and death registrations and other records indexed by county. In 1891, there were further substantial changes to the areas of many parishes, as the boundary commission appointed under the Local Government (Scotland) Act 1889 eliminated many anomalies, and assigned divided parishes to a single county.

Parishes have had no direct administrative function since 1930. In that year, all parishes and parts of parishes outside burghs (technically known as landward), were grouped into districts with elected district councils. These council districts were abolished in 1975, and the new local council authorities established in that year often cut across parish boundaries. In 1996, there was a further reorganisation of Scottish local government, and a number of civil parishes lie in two or more council areas. The counties and county place-names are retained for Land Registrations, Lieutenancy areas, Chambers of Commerce, and various community organizations, although their administrations were taken over by Regional Councils.

Civil parishes are still used for some statistical purposes, and separate census figures are published for them. As their areas have been largely unchanged since the 19th century this allows for comparison of population figures over an extended period of time.

There have been many variations in the spelling of some parish names over the historical period. In this list the names as used in the reports of the General Register Office for Scotland for the 2002 census are used.

List

Modern-day statistics of historic counties 
This is determined from the above data.

See also 
 List of community council areas in Scotland
 List of Church of Scotland parishes
 Local government in Scotland

References

External links
Scottish Civil Parish Maps at ArcGIS
scotlandsplaces.gov.uk displays parish maps for individual counties, as in this example of Dumfriesshire parishes.

!
History of local government in Scotland
Administrative divisions of Scotland